Lisandra Espinosa Zamora (born 1986) is a Cuban team handball player. She has played on the Cuban national team, and participated at the 2011 World Women's Handball Championship in Brazil.

References

1986 births
Living people
Cuban female handball players
Handball players at the 2015 Pan American Games
Pan American Games competitors for Cuba